Argentina v Peru was a football match between Argentina and Peru that took place on June 21, 1978 during the 1978 FIFA World Cup within Group B. In order to advance to the knockout stage and beat Brazil by goal difference, Argentina needed to win by four goals and agreed to play against Peru. The match ended 6-0 in an Argentine victory with two goals from Mario Kempes, two goals from Leopoldo Luque, one goal by Alberto Tarantini and one from René Houseman. The 1978 World Cup would go on to end in Argentina earning their first championship title after beating the Netherlands 3-1. The match remains to be one of the most controversial in World Cup history as it's been speculated that there has been some collusion in favor of Argentina. This was due to the World Cup taking place during the military dictatorship of the National Reorganization Process under Jorge Rafael Videla which in turn lead to speculation that the World Cup was an attempt to appease the population in the face of human rights violations.

Several national football players, journalists and politicians have given different interpretations over a possible outside interference within the match to benefit Argentina with no consensus on the circumstances. The denunciation of the former Argentine Minister of Finance,  who claimed that a bomb detonated when Argentina scored the fourth goal needed to qualify. Players of the Peruvian national football team have given different versions of what happened as some alleged that irregular things happened before and during the match such as the visit of the Argentine dictator Videla to the Peruvian locker room while others deny any type of arrangement and claim that Argentina was vastly superior to Peru during the match.

FIFA arranged for the Brazil-Poland match to be played before Argentina-Peru, citing television and ticket sales issues. Match times had been agreed long before the start of the World Cup. The measure was objected by Brazil when both games were played non-simultaneously, since in this way the Albiceleste team could know in advance the number of goals they had to score. FIFA generally held the matches of the same group on different days or times, at that time it was not usual for the matches of the same group to be played simultaneously. After 1982 FIFA World Cup would the defining group matches would be played simultaneously after the Disgrace of Gijón, another World Cup controversy.

In 2012 it was rumored that FIFA could investigate the matter, and if it found evidence that an arrangement existed, it could annul the title to Argentina. But there were no major attempts by FIFA in this regard.

Background

Argentina
Argentina was runner-up in the 1930 FIFA World Cup held in Uruguay where the host country won the title 4-2. After that, the furthest Argentina had gone in a World Cup was the quarterfinals at the 1966 FIFA World Cup held in England when Argentina lost 0-1 against England when Antonio Ubaldo Rattín was sent off after insulting the referee despite the fact that he did not understand Spanish. Regardless, Argentina qualified in all World Cups except for the 1970 FIFA World Cup in Mexico and declined to participate in 1938, 1950 and 1954. Due to being the hosts of the 1978 FIFA World Cup, Argentina did not have to qualify.

Argentina had also won the Copa América in 1921, 1925, 1927, 1929, 1937, 1941, 1945, 1946, 1947, 1955, 1957 and 1959 and the champions of the 1960 Panamerican Championship and runners-up in 1916, 1917, 1920, 1923, 1924, 1926, 1935, 1942, 1959 extra (South American championship) and 1967. At the Olympic Games, the senior team achieved its greatest achievement at the 1928 Summer Olympics, winning the silver medal.

Peru

Peru participated in the 1930 FIFA World Cup but was left out in the first phase. They wouldn't participate again until the 1970 FIFA World Cup where they obtained the Fair Play Award reached the quarterfinals losing against the champion, Brazil by 2:4, to this day it was the furthest that Peru had reached in a World Cup. In 1978 they qualified again for a World Cup, after failing to qualify in the 1974 edition .

Peru was crowned champion of the Copa América on 1939 and 1975. On the other hand, Peru competed twice in the Olympic Games and obtained the gold medal in the Bolivarian Games in 1938, 1947, 1961, 1973 and 1981.

Peruvian Qualification for the 1978 World Cup

Peru advances to the finals

During the finals, Peru lost against Brazil by one goal but managed to beat Bolivia 5-0, allowing Peru to reach second place and successfully qualify for the 1978 FIFA World Cup.

Brazil and Peru qualified for the 1978 World Cup.
Bolivia went to the intercontinental playoffs.

Recent Match History Between Argentina and Peru
Matches prior to the World Cup stood out, with César Luis Menotti as technical director of Argentina. All of them ended in victory for the Argentines.

1978 FIFA World Cup

Qualification for Group B

Argentina

Argentina qualified second in their group after beating Hungary and France 2:1 . For the third game, Argentina was already qualified together with Italy. The third and last game of the group was Italy-Argentina, which ended with a 1:0 victory for the Italians.

Peru

Peru qualified first in their group by getting a 3-1 victory against Scotland, a 0-0 draw against the Netherlands and a 4-1 victory against Iran.

Group B

Argentina had qualified for the second group stage after obtaining second place in Group 1 behind Italy while Brazil had also obtained the second position of Group 3 after Austria. Both Peru and Poland had achieved first place in Group 4 and Group 2 respectively. The headquarters of this group were Mendoza and Rosario.

The first game pitted Brazil against Peru, ending with a 3-0 victory for the Brazilians. Argentina also beat Poland 2-0 in Rosario with two goals from Mario Kempes. The victory of Poland over Peru by 1-0 and the goalless draw between Argentina and Brazil left a group close in which, with the exception of Peru, the other three teams had a chance to reach the final. Argentina and Brazil reached the last game with 3 points, although the Brazilians had a greater goal difference. Poland arrived with 2 points but with chances to win the group if, after their victory, Argentina lost or tied without surpassing it in goal difference.

The matches were not played at the same time but Brazil and Poland played first at 16:45 while Argentina and Peru did so later, at 19:15. Brazil won their match 3-1, with two goals from Roberto Dinamite and one from Nelinho. With this result he finished with 5 points and +5 goal difference. In order to reach the final, Argentina had to win with a margin of four goals since they had a goal difference of +2. Argentina managed to prevail over Peru by 6-0 and thus qualify for the final.

Match Lineups

Controversy

The game was played on June 21 and it was the last turn of Group B of the second phase. Argentina came at a disadvantage against Brazil with the same points but with a goal-less difference. FIFA ordered that Brazil should play first against Poland and Argentina then against Peru. This gave the Argentine team an advantage, knowing in advance how many goals would be needed to reach the final. In January, FIFA had resolved in meetings prior to the draw for the venues that Argentina would play its first-round matches and in the event of qualifying, the second phase would always play at 7:15 p.m. while the others, except for the opening match and the final, at 1:00 p.m. and 4:15 p.m. Given the few ticket sales abroad, FIFA feared that in those matches where the local team was not involved, there would be low attendance. Therefore, if Argentina's matches were played simultaneously with others, the public that did not go to see Argentina on the field, would stay at home and watch the matches on television. At the time, no one had filed opposition to this measure. West Germany enjoyed a similar benefit in the 1974 FIFA World Cup. When it came time for the decisive group matches however, the Brazilians pushed to play their game against Poland at the same time as Argentina against Peru but FIFA objected. Its managers argued that it was impossible to change schedules on television. Thus Brazil played its game and won 3-1, forcing Argentina to win by a four goal difference. Knowing this, Argentina played in the second turn against Peru, who were already out of the World Cup by not reaping any points within the group. Minutes before the game, President Jorge Rafael Videla visited the Peruvian locker room accompanied by former American Secretary of State and organizer of Operation Condor, Henry Kissinger and read a message to the players from the Peruvian dictator Francisco Morales Bermúdez on the Argentine-Peruvian brotherhood. Argentina finally obtained a historic result of 6-0, defeating Brazil on goal difference and agreeing to play the final against the Netherlands.

Some years later, the result and some particular circumstances during the game raised suspicions about the legitimacy of the match. Upon returning to Lima, the Peruvian team met an angry mob who threw coins, tomatoes and other objects at them as recounted by Peruvian player Guillermo La Rosa. Ten days after the end of the World Cup, on July 6, 1978, the Argentine dictatorship sanctioned Decree No. 1463/78 "granting an extraordinary non-refundable credit to the Republic of Peru." There were also versions that Brazil had given an economic incentive to the Peruvian players to beat Argentina, a rumor that would be defended by the Argentine player Mario Kempes as well as by the Peruvian players Teófilo Cubillas and Héctor Chumpitaz who admitted that they were going to receive a $5,000 incentive each. At the same time, there were rumors that local leaders gave Poland incentives to beat Brazil. Kempes denied that there could have been any agreement since Peru had some clear arrivals, including a vertical shot from the Argentine goal. Another factor of the Peruvian decline was that each match was played every three days which wore out the Peruvian team, not used to the amount of consistent playing. In addition to this, an internal division began to emerge in the Peruvian national football team between the players of Sporting Cristal and Alianza Lima.

Different people and players declared that part of the Peruvian team was pressured or bribed to lose the game by a large sum. Others, based on recent investigations, suggest that there was an agreement between the two governments within the framework of Operation Condor. Years later Videla would deny any type of arrangement, stating: "I didn't take a peso out of my pocket. There was no talk of a possible arrangement before the game, neither in the Government, nor in the Junta."

In the book How They Stole the Game, the British historian David Yallop maintained that Videla ordered Rear Admiral Carlos Alberto Lacoste, in charge of EAM'78, to take charge of arranging the result with the ruling dictatorship in Peru, led by General Morales Bermúdez, 23 who decades later would be sentenced to life imprisonment by the III Criminal Court of Rome, for his participation in Operation Condor. According to Yallop, Lacoste made contact with three officials who accompanied the Peruvian team and offered them a million-dollar bribe of fifty million dollars and a donation of 35,000 tons of grains. After the World Cup, the Treasury Secretary of the dictatorship,  confirmed the Argentine "donations" made to Peru and explained that they were a type of donations that were only made in cases of humanitarian catastrophes.

The businessman and former Secretary of the Treasury, Juan Alemann denounced in 1982 that Vice Admiral Carlos Alberto Lacoste had been the mastermind of an attack with an explosive device at Alemann's home, when on June 21, 1978, at the precise moment in which Argentina scored the fourth goal against Peru that gave it a pass to the final, a bomb exploded in the house of the then Secretary of Finance Juan Alemann and Lacoste for overpricing in the organization of the tournament. Alemann blamed Massera himself for the attack:

On December 12, 2007, the Argentine journalist Ezequiel Fernández Moores interviewed Fernando Rodríguez Mondragón, capo of the Cali Cartel led by his uncle Miguel Rodríguez Orejuela who gave a detailed account of the way in which the bribery would have been carried out. He recounted what his uncle revealed to him, as he served as a mediator with Peruvian officials at the request of the Argentine military. According to Rodríguez Mondragón, the Argentine and player representative Carlos Quieto told Rodríguez Orejuela that the Argentine military and the Argentine Football Association (AFA) wanted to meet in reserve with the authorities of the Peruvian Football Federation (FPF), with which the Colombian drug lord maintained close relations. The meeting would have been held in Miraflores, Lima the next day, two days before the game and the captain of the ship Lacoste and two other people participated on behalf of Argentina with the president and treasurer of the FPF representing Peru. According to Rodríguez Mondragón, there it was agreed to pay the bribes to the Peruvian players and leaders and the donation of wheat which had already been requested.

Several players of the Peruvian team maintained that, in their opinion, suspicious irregularities or bribery had taken place. In 1986, Juan Carlos Oblitas declared to the press that he felt "ashamed", then stating that he thought that "this match was not normal". In 2003, Oblitas announced that the dictator Videla and the former American Secretary of State Henry Kissinger had been present in the Peruvian locker room, a few minutes before starting the game. In 2018, two starting players of the 1978 Peruvian team, José Velásquez and Germán Leguía had also declared that Videla and Kissinger entered the Peruvian locker room and read a message from the Peruvian dictator Morales Bermúdez to the players. Both former players declared that the visit was interpreted by the Peruvian team as a threat. Velásquez also said that although he lacked evidence, he knew several Peruvian managers and six players who participated to fix the match, naming Rodulfo Manzo, Raúl Gorriti, Juan José Muñante and Ramón Quiroga with the latter being born in Argentina. In an investigation carried out by Fernández Moores for Radio Continental, journalist Carlos Juvenal said that the captain of the Peruvian squad, Héctor Chumpitaz confessed to him about "additional money" but added that he would never admit it publicly.

The accused players have denied the claims, pointing out that they lacked evidence. Quiroga accused Velásquez of having a "lack of sanity" and responded with "I did not sell myself. If I had taken money to go back, today I could not walk through Lima and I do it without problems." He also added that: 

Despite this, on another occasion Quiroga has pointed out that that day some of his teammates had acted "strange" in the game, such as defender Rodulfo Manzo, who ducked in the fourth Argentine goal, for which Quiroga points out that: "'Negro' Manzo didn't stop anything, neither he nor the defense. In Argentina's fourth goal, Manzo ducked and left the shooter alone." In addition, the unusual lineup of Peruvian coach Marcos Calderón stood out who left several notable and experienced players out of the match. In his response, Muñante stated that Velásquez "was delusional" and that Calderón didn't accept any bribes. Muñante also recounted that they didn't ask the Peruvian technical director not to line up goalkeeper Quiroga, an Argentine nationalized Peruvian, and clarified that there was a meeting in which Quiroga was asked if he wanted to save with his agreement. Muñante asserted that no player missed out since Peru was able to score two or three goals against Argentina in the first 15 minutes. Manzo maintained that neither he nor his teammates had received money for the result of the match and even though there have been speculations, there has never been any real proof of any fraud. Katia Gorriti, Gorriti's daughter, stated that Velásquez's opinions were disrespectful and unfair as they stained her father's name, also indicating that she would take legal action.

Other leading players in the match denied any bribery or match fixing and argued that there is no evidence to support the stories, which speak of corruption and agreements. Héctor Chumpitaz, captain of Peru, declared that his team was never sold. Jaime Duarte stated that "for 29 years they have been coming up with new stories and that there is no evidence to prove such bribes." César Cueto declared that this match was legitimate, and that the defeat was due to poor physical preparation and fatigue after eleven days of competition, describing the accusations as "press inventions". Teófilo Cubillas declared that there was no arrangement and denied the rumors. He also stated that if they had played three times in those months, Argentina would have thrashed them again since shortly before Ecuador had also scored six goals against them and that Argentina itself had easily beaten them in another friendly. According to Cubillas, Peru "was going down" after losing to Brazil and Poland and that although they had won their group in the first phase of the Cup, the team was not doing well, unlike the Argentine team, which he described as "a waterspout that came upon us". Finally, Cubillas considered it absurd to think that Argentina sent tons of wheat to Peru, repaying the fact. He further added to his previous comments, stating that:

Reactions from the Argentine players have been more aware of Videla's dictatorship with Leopoldo Luque stating "With what I know now, I can't say I am proud of my victory... but I didn't realize, most of us didn't. We just played football.” Similarly, Ricardo Villa commented “There is no doubt we were used politically.”

In 2020, Dutch player Johnny Rep and Brazilian player Roberto Dinamite stated that the match had probably been arranged to "reassure the population".

Former Peruvian senator Genaro Ledesma Izquieta denounced that the party's supposed arrangement was carried out during the Peruvian dictatorship under the condition that Videla would release 13 Peruvian political prisoners, this operation would have been part of the Operation Condor. In 2012, after statements by former legislator Ledesma, it was rumored that FIFA could annul Argentina's title in 1978 if it was proven that there was an arrangement in their match against Peru but the case hasn't gone any further. In an article published in 2018, the Peruvian journalist Valentín Ahón stated that he didn't believe that there were bribes or a pact between the dictatorships of Argentina and Peru.

In Popular Culture
The match is mentioned in the song La argentinidad al palo by the Argentine rock band Bersuit Vergarabat, mentioning "the 6 to 0 at Peru" among Argentina's several "achievements" in the form of a critical parody.

References

1978 FIFA World Cup
Argentina v Peru
1978
1978
Argentina v Peru
Argentina–Peru relations
D
Aus
1978 controversies
Sport in Rosario, Santa Fe
Controversies in Peru
Controversies in Argentina
June 1978 sports events in South America